West Somerset was a local government district in the English county of Somerset. It merged with Taunton Deane to form Somerset West and Taunton on 1 April 2019.
According to figures released by the Office for National Statistics in 2009, the population of West Somerset had the oldest average age in the United Kingdom at 52.
The largest centres of population were the coastal towns of Minehead (population 10,000) and Watchet (4,400).

A scheduled monument is a nationally important archaeological site or monument which is given legal protection by being placed on a list (or "schedule") by the Secretary of State for Culture, Media and Sport; English Heritage takes the leading role in identifying such sites. The legislation governing this is the Ancient Monuments and Archaeological Areas Act 1979. The term "monument" can apply to the whole range of archaeological sites, and they are not always visible above ground. Such sites have to have been deliberately constructed by human activity. They range from prehistoric standing stones and burial sites, through Roman remains and medieval structures such as castles and monasteries, to later structures such as industrial sites and buildings constructed for the World Wars or the Cold War.

There are 201 scheduled monuments in West Somerset. Some of the oldest, particularly on Exmoor and the Quantock Hills are Neolithic, Bronze Age or Iron Age including hillforts, cairns, bowl barrows and other tumulis. More recent sites include several motte-and-bailey castles and church or village crosses which date from the Middle Ages. The geography with large numbers of streams is reflected by the number of packhorse and other bridges included in the list. The mining history of the area is also represented by several sections of the West Somerset Mineral Railway and associated ruins of mine buildings which are now scheduled. The most recent monuments are World War II pillboxes. The monuments are listed below using the titles given in the English Heritage data sheets.

Monuments 
 Scheduled monuments in West Somerset (A–G) – list of scheduled monuments
 Scheduled monuments in West Somerset (H–Z) – list of scheduled monuments

See also
 Scheduled Monuments in Somerset
 Scheduled monuments in Taunton Deane
 Grade I listed buildings in West Somerset
 Grade II* listed buildings in West Somerset

Notes

References

LIst
History of Somerset
List
Somerset, West
Lists of buildings and structures in Somerset